Baer House may refer to:

In Switzerland
Baer House (Zurich), a property of national-level cultural significance in Zurich

In the US
Baer House (Little Rock, Arkansas), listed on the National Register of Historic Places (NRHP)
Eder-Baer House, Chaska, Minnesota, NRHP-listed in Carver County
Albert R. Baer House, Menomonee Falls, Wisconsin, NRHP-listed in Waukesha County